Cowbridge House,  southeast of Malmesbury, Wiltshire, England, was an eighteenth century house that was demolished in 2007.

During the Second World War the EKCO company used the house as a shadow factory for the manufacture of radar equipment. The factory continued after the war, producing radio and telecommunications equipment; the company was taken over by Pye TMC and then Philips, and later became part of AT&T. The site was in use as offices until 2004 when the owners, Lucent Technologies, moved their operations to Swindon. Subsequently the site was redeveloped for housing.

References

External links 

Cowbridge House at the National Archives

Former houses in Wiltshire
Buildings and structures completed in the 18th century